George S. Patton (George Smith Patton Jr., 1885–1945) was a general of the United States Army during World War II.

George Patton may also refer to:

 George S. Patton Sr. (1833–1864), a Confederate colonel during the American Civil War, grandfather of World War II general George S. Patton
 George S. Patton (attorney) (1856–1927), American attorney, businessman and politician, father of World War II general George S. Patton
 George B. Patton (born 1898), American attorney and politician, North Carolina Attorney General
 George Patton IV (1923–2004), a major general in the United States Army who served in the Korean War and the Vietnam War,  the son of World War II general George S. Patton
 George Patton, Lord Glenalmond (1803–1869), Scottish politician and judge

See also
George Paton (disambiguation)